Rickey Woodard is an American jazz saxophonist.

Born in Nashville, Tennessee, from 1980 on Woodard spent seven years with the Ray Charles band.

A member of the Clayton-Hamilton Jazz Orchestra, Woodard has also recorded with Frank Capp and as a member of Jeannie and Jimmy Cheatham's Sweet Baby Blues Band.

In 1993, he embarked on a series of yearly visits to the Peterborough Jazz Club in England, billed with veteran British jazz musicians such as Dick Morrissey, John Burch, and Tony Archer.

Discography
As leader/co-leader
 1991: The Frank Capp Trio Presents Rickey Woodard (Concord 4469)
 1991: California Cooking! (Candid 79509)
 1991: Night Mist (Fresh Sound 190) – with Eric Reed, Tony Dumas, and Roy McCurdy
 1992: The Tokyo Express (Candid 79527) – with James Williams, Christian McBride, and Joe Chambers
 1994: Yazoo (Concord 4629) – with Cedar Walton, Jeff Littleton, Ralph Penland, and Ray Brown (trumpet)
 1995: Quality Time: Frank Capp Quartet Featuring Rickey Woodard (Concord 4677)
 1996: The Silver Strut (Concord 4716)
 1997: The Tenor Trio (JMI/JVC 7501) – with Ernie Watts, Pete Christlieb, Gerry Wiggins, Chuck Berghofer, and Frank Capp
 2001: California Cooking #2 (Candid 79762)
 2004: Picture This      (Rickey Woodard Music 634479089459)
 2009: Why Did I Do It   (Rickey Woodard Music 884502065787)
 2009: Pineapple Delight (Rickey Woodard Music 884502252552)

As a member of The Clayton-Hamilton Jazz Orchestra
 1989: Groove Shop – Clayton-Hamilton Jazz Orchestra (Capri)
 1990: Boogie Down – Ernestine Anderson with The Clayton-Hamilton Jazz Orchestra (Concord)
 1991: Heart And Soul – Clayton-Hamilton Jazz Orchestra (Capri)
 1994: Absolutely! – Clayton-Hamilton Jazz Orchestra (Lake Street)
 1999: Explosive! – Milt Jackson Meets The Clayton-Hamilton Jazz Orchestra (Qwest/WB)
 2000: Shout Me Out! – Clayton-Hamilton Jazz Orchestra (Fable/Lightyear/WEA)
 2004: Live At MCG – Clayton-Hamilton Jazz Orchestra (MCG Jazz)
 2005: Christmas Songs – Diana Krall featuring The Clayton-Hamilton Jazz Orchestra (Verve)
 2006: Dear Mr. Sinatra – John Pizzarelli with The Clayton-Hamilton Jazz Orchestra (Telarc)
 2009: Charles Aznavour & The Clayton-Hamilton Jazz Orchestra (Capitol Jazz/EMI)
 2011: Sundays In New York – Trijntje Oosterhuis with The Clayton-Hamilton Jazz Orchestra (Blue Note/EMI)
 2014: The L.A. Treasures Project: Live At Alvas Showroom – Clayton-Hamilton Jazz Orchestra (Capri) – with guests: Ernie Andrews, Barbara Morrison

As sideman
 1991: Rockin' With Rachmaninoff – Horace Silver (Bop City [rel. 2003])
 1991: Basket Full Of Blues – Jeannie & Jimmy Cheatham And The Sweet Baby Blues Band (Concord)
 1993: Blues And The Boogie Masters – Jeannie & Jimmy Cheatham And The Sweet Baby Blues Band (Concord)
 1994: Timepiece – Kenny Rogers (143/Atlantic)
 1994: Pencil Packin' Papa – Horace Silver (Columbia)
 1994: Seven Sensational Saxophones – Fujitsu-Concord 26th Jazz Festival (Concord) – with Jesse Davis, Gary Foster, Ken Peplowski, Chris Potter,  Bill Ramsay, Frank Wess, and Rickey Woodard
 1995: In A Hefti Bag – Frank Capp Juggernaut Band (Concord) 
 1995: Gud Nuz Bluz – Jeannie & Jimmy Cheatham And The Sweet Baby Blues Band (Concord)
 1996: Shaking Free – Nnenna Freelon (Concord)
 1996: Play It Again Sam – Frank Capp Juggernaut Band (Concord) 
 1996: Lefty Leaps In – John Leitham (USA Music Group) – with Pete Christlieb, Tom Ranier, and Roy McCurdy
 1997: Live! – John Leitham (C.A.R.S.) – with Pete Christlieb, Shelly Berg, and Joe LaBarbera

References

1950 births
Living people
American jazz saxophonists
American male saxophonists
21st-century American saxophonists
21st-century American male musicians
American male jazz musicians
The Capp-Pierce Juggernaut members
Clayton-Hamilton Jazz Orchestra members